Richmond-Wolfe (or Richmond et Wolfe) was a former provincial electoral district in the province of Quebec, Canada. It was created for the 1867 election (and an electoral district of that name existed earlier in the Legislative Assembly of the Province of Canada).  Its final election was in 1886.  It disappeared in the 1890 election and its successor electoral districts were Richmond and Wolfe.

Members of the Legislative Assembly
 Jacques Picard, Conservative Party (1867–1890)

References
 Election results (National Assembly)
 Election results (Quebecpolitique.com)

Former provincial electoral districts of Quebec